Shooting sports at the 2013 Asian Youth Games was held in Fangshan Shooting Hall, Nanjing, China between 18 and 21 August 2013.

Medalists

Boys

Girls

Medal table

Results

Boys

10 m air pistol
21 August

10 m air rifle
19 August

Trap

Qualification
20–21 August

Semifinal
21 August

Finals
21 August

Skeet

Qualification
18–19 August

Semifinal
19 August

Finals
19 August

Girls

10 m air pistol
20 August

10 m air rifle
18 August

Trap
20 August

Qualification

Semifinal

Finals

Skeet
18 August

Qualification

Semifinal

Finals

References
10m Air Pistol Men Results
10m Air Rifle Men Results
Trap Men Results
Skeet Men Results
10m Air Pistol Women Results
10m Air Rifle Women Results
Trap Women Results
Skeet Women Results

External links
Official Website
Results

2013 Asian Youth Games events
Asian Youth Games